Nerkin (Armenian: Ներքին) also Romanized as Nerqin and Nerk'in means "Lower" in  Armenian and is used frequently as a place name element.

References

All pages beginning with "Nerkin"
All pages beginning with "Nerqin"

Armenian language